Darryl Lamont Pounds (born July 21, 1972) is a former American football cornerback in the National Football League for the Washington Redskins and the Denver Broncos.  He played college football at Nicholls State University where he was named second-team Associated Press All-American in 1991 and first-team Associated Press All-American in 1994. He was drafted in the third round of the 1995 NFL Draft by the Washington Redskins. Pounds played high school football at South Pike High School in Magnolia, Mississippi.

References
  Nicholls State Colonels media guide

External links
 Nicholls State bio
 NFL bio

1972 births
Living people
Players of American football from Fort Worth, Texas
American football defensive backs
Nicholls Colonels football players
All-American college football players
Washington Redskins players
Denver Broncos players